The Central Coast Waves is a rugby union team based on the Central Coast, New South Wales, Australia. The Waves played in the Shute Shield pre-season competition in 2006, based out  of the Bluetongue Central Coast Stadium.

The team was invited to compete in the Tooheys New Cup for the 2007 season but, due to time constraints and the task of setting up such a campaign, the Central Coast Rugby Union (CCRU) asked for the invitation to be held off until the 2008 season.

References

External links
 Central Coast Rugby Union official site
 Former 

Rugby union teams in New South Wales
Sport on the Central Coast (New South Wales)
Rugby clubs established in 2006
2006 establishments in Australia